Sirajul Hossain Khan (1926-2007) was a Jatiya Party politician and former minister and member of parliament for Habiganj-2.

Early life
Khan was born on 17 July 1926, in Baniachong village, Baniachong Upazila, Habiganj subdivision, Sylhet district (of Assam, British Raj).

Career
Khan served in the Bangladesh Liberation war in the Bangladesh Muktijuddha Samannay Parishad. He was elected to the Parliament from Habiganj-2 as a Jatiya Party candidate in 1986 and 1988 and was a cabinet Minister (1985-1990). He served as the Bureau chief of Pakistan Times in Dacca and was the founder Editor of the Eastern News Agency (ENA). He was a trade unionist who served as the General Secretary of the East Pakistan Journalists Union and the Bangladesh Sramik Federation.

Death
Khan died in Dhaka on 17 February 2007.

References

Jatiya Party politicians
2007 deaths
3rd Jatiya Sangsad members
1927 births
People from Baniachong Upazila